AutoCAD is a commercial computer-aided design (CAD) and drafting software application. Developed and marketed by Autodesk, AutoCAD was first released in December 1982 as a desktop app running on microcomputers with internal graphics controllers. Before AutoCAD was introduced, most commercial CAD programs ran on mainframe computers or minicomputers, with each CAD operator (user) working at a separate graphics terminal. AutoCAD is also available as mobile and web apps. AutoCAD is primarily used for 2 Dimensional drawings, and even though 3D modeling is available in AutoCAD other computer-aided design software like Fusion 360, Inventor and Solidworks are preferred in 3D modeling.

AutoCAD is used in industry, by architects, project managers, engineers, graphic designers, city planners and other professionals. It was supported by 750 training centers worldwide in 1994.

Introduction

AutoCAD was derived from a program that began in 1977, and then released in 1979  called Interact CAD, also referred to in early Autodesk documents as MicroCAD, which was written prior to Autodesk's (then Marinchip Software Partners) formation by Autodesk cofounder Michael Riddle.

The first version by Autodesk was demonstrated at the 1982 Comdex and released that December. AutoCAD supported CP/M-80 computers. As Autodesk's flagship product, by March 1986 AutoCAD had become the most ubiquitous CAD program worldwide. The 2022 release marked the 36th major release of AutoCAD for Windows and the 12th consecutive year of AutoCAD for Mac. The native file format of AutoCAD is .dwg. This and, to a lesser extent, its interchange file format DXF, have become de facto, if proprietary, standards for CAD data interoperability, particularly for 2D drawing exchange. AutoCAD has included support for .dwf, a format developed and promoted by Autodesk, for publishing CAD data.

File formats

Filename extensions
AutoCAD's native file formats are denoted either by a .dwg, .dwt, .dws, or .dxf filename extension.

The primary file format for 2D and 3D drawing files created with AutoCAD is .dwg. While other third-party CAD software applications can create .dwg files, AutoCAD uniquely creates RealDWG files.

Using AutoCAD, any .dwg file may be saved to a derivative format. These derivative formats include:
 Drawing Template Files .dwt: New .dwg are created from a .dwt file. Although the default template file is acad.dwt for AutoCAD and acadlt.dwt for AutoCAD LT, custom .dwt files may be created to include foundational configurations such as drawing units and layers.
 Drawing Standards File .dws: Using the CAD Standards feature of AutoCAD, a Drawing Standards File may be associated to any .dwg or .dwt file to enforce graphical standards.
 Drawing Interchange Format .dxf: The .dxf format is an ASCII representation of a .dwg file, and is used to transfer data between various applications.

Features

Compatibility with other software 
ESRI ArcMap 10 permits export as AutoCAD drawing files. Civil 3D permits export as AutoCAD objects and as LandXML. Third-party file converters exist for specific formats such as Bentley MX GENIO Extension, PISTE Extension (France), ISYBAU (Germany), OKSTRA and Microdrainage (UK); also, conversion of .pdf files is feasible, however, the accuracy of the results may be unpredictable or distorted. For example, jagged edges may appear. Several vendors provide online conversions for free such as Cometdocs.

Language
AutoCAD and AutoCAD LT are available for English, German, French, Italian, Spanish, Japanese, Korean, Chinese Simplified, Chinese Traditional, Brazilian Portuguese, Russian, Czech, Polish and Hungarian (also through additional language packs). The extent of localization varies from full translation of the product to documentation only. The AutoCAD command set is localized as a part of the software localization.

Extensions
AutoCAD supports a number of APIs for customization and automation. These include AutoLISP, Visual LISP, VBA, .NET and ObjectARX. ObjectARX is a C++ class library, which was also the base for:
 products extending AutoCAD functionality to specific fields
 creating products such as AutoCAD Architecture, AutoCAD Electrical, AutoCAD Civil 3D
 third-party AutoCAD-based application
There are a large number of AutoCAD plugins (add-on applications) available on the application store Autodesk Exchange Apps.
AutoCAD's DXF, drawing exchange format, allows importing and exporting drawing information.

Vertical integration
Autodesk has also developed a few vertical programs for discipline-specific enhancements such as:

 Advance Steel
 AutoCAD Architecture
 AutoCAD Electrical
 AutoCAD Map 3D
 AutoCAD Mechanical
 AutoCAD MEP
 AutoCAD Plant 3D
 Autodesk Civil 3D

Since AutoCAD 2019 several verticals are included with AutoCAD subscription as Industry-Specific Toolset.

For example, AutoCAD Architecture (formerly Architectural Desktop) permits architectural designers to draw 3D objects, such as walls, doors, and windows, with more intelligent data associated with them rather than simple objects, such as lines and circles. The data can be programmed to represent specific architectural products sold in the construction industry, or extracted into a data file for pricing, materials estimation, and other values related to the objects represented.

Additional tools generate standard 2D drawings, such as elevations and sections, from a 3D architectural model. Similarly, Civil Design, Civil Design 3D, and Civil Design Professional support data-specific objects facilitating easy standard civil engineering calculations and representations.

Softdesk Civil was developed as an AutoCAD add-on by a company in New Hampshire called Softdesk (originally DCA).  Softdesk was acquired by Autodesk, and Civil became Land Development Desktop (LDD), later renamed Land Desktop. Civil 3D was later developed and Land Desktop was retired.

Variants

AutoCAD LT
AutoCAD LT is the lower-cost version of AutoCAD, with reduced capabilities, first released in November 1993. Autodesk developed AutoCAD LT to have an entry-level CAD package to compete in the lower price level. Priced at $495, it became the first AutoCAD product priced below $1000. It was sold directly by Autodesk and in computer stores unlike the full version of AutoCAD, which must be purchased from official Autodesk dealers. AutoCAD LT 2015 introduced Desktop Subscription service from $360 per year; as of 2018, three subscription plans were available, from $50 a month to a 3-year, $1170 license.

While there are hundreds of small differences between the full AutoCAD package and AutoCAD LT, there are a few recognized major differences in the software's features:

 3D capabilities: AutoCAD LT lacks the ability to create, visualize and render 3D models as well as 3D printing.
 Network licensing: AutoCAD LT cannot be used on multiple machines over a network.
 Customization: AutoCAD LT does not support customization with LISP, ARX, .NET and VBA.
 Management and automation capabilities with Sheet Set Manager and Action Recorder.
 CAD standards management tools.

AutoCAD Mobile and AutoCAD Web
AutoCAD Mobile and AutoCAD Web (formerly AutoCAD WS and AutoCAD 360) is an account-based mobile and web application enabling registered users to view, edit, and share AutoCAD files via mobile device and web using a limited AutoCAD feature set — and using cloud-stored drawing files.  The program, which is an evolution and combination of previous products, uses a freemium business model with a free plan and two paid levels, including various amounts of storage, tools, and online access to drawings. 360 includes new features such as a "Smart Pen" mode and linking to third-party cloud-based storage such as Dropbox. Having evolved from Flash-based software, AutoCAD Web uses HTML5 browser technology available in newer browsers including Firefox and Google Chrome.

AutoCAD WS began with a version for the iPhone and subsequently expanded to include versions for the iPod Touch, iPad, Android phones, and Android tablets. Autodesk released the iOS version in September 2010, following with the Android version on April 20, 2011. The program is available via download at no cost from the App Store (iOS), Google Play (Android) and Amazon Appstore (Android).

In its initial iOS version, AutoCAD WS supported drawing of lines, circles, and other shapes; creation of text and comment boxes; and management of color, layer, and measurements — in both landscape and portrait modes. Version 1.3, released August 17, 2011, added support for unit typing, layer visibility, area measurement and file management. The Android variant includes the iOS feature set along with such unique features as the ability to insert text or captions by voice command as well as manually. Both Android and iOS versions allow the user to save files on-line — or off-line in the absence of an Internet connection.

In 2011, Autodesk announced plans to migrate the majority of its software to "the cloud", starting with the AutoCAD WS mobile application.

According to a 2013 interview with Ilai Rotbaein, an AutoCAD WS product manager for Autodesk, the name AutoCAD WS had no definitive meaning, and was interpreted variously as Autodesk Web Service, White Sheet or Work Space. In 2013, AutoCAD WS was renamed to AutoCAD 360. Later, it was renamed to AutoCAD Web App.

Student versions
AutoCAD is licensed, for free, to students, educators, and educational institutions, with a 12-month renewable license available. Licenses acquired before March 25, 2020 were a 36-month license, with its last renovation on March 24, 2020. The student version of AutoCAD is functionally identical to the full commercial version, with one exception: DWG files created or edited by a student version have an internal bit-flag set (the "educational flag"). When such a DWG file is printed by any version of AutoCAD (commercial or student) older than AutoCAD 2014 SP1 or AutoCAD 2019 and newer, the output includes a plot stamp/banner on all four sides. Objects created in the Student Version cannot be used for commercial use. Student Version objects "infect" a commercial version DWG file if they are imported in versions older than AutoCAD 2015 or newer than AutoCAD 2018.

Ports

Windows

AutoCAD Release 12 in 1992 was the first version of the software to support the Windows platform - in that case Windows 3.1.  After Release 14 in 1997, support for MS-DOS, Unix and Macintosh were dropped, and AutoCAD was exclusively Windows supported. In general any new AutoCAD version supports the current Windows version and some older ones.  AutoCAD 2016 to 2020 support Windows 7 up to Windows 10.

Mac
Autodesk stopped supporting Apple's Macintosh computers in 1994. Over the next several years, no compatible versions for the Mac were released. In 2010 Autodesk announced that it would once again support Apple's Mac OS X software in the future. Most of the features found in the 2012 Windows version can be found in the 2012 Mac version. The main difference is the user interface and layout of the program. The interface is designed so that users who are already familiar with Apple's macOS software will find it similar to other Mac applications. Autodesk has also built-in various features in order to take full advantage of Apple's Trackpad capabilities as well as the full-screen mode in Apple's OS X Lion. AutoCAD 2012 for Mac supports both the editing and saving of files in DWG formatting that will allow the file to be compatible with other platforms besides macOS. AutoCAD 2019 for Mac requires Mac OS X 10.11 (El Capitan) or later.

AutoCAD LT 2013 was available through the Mac App Store for $899.99. The full-featured version of AutoCAD 2013 for Mac, however, wasn't available through the Mac App Store due to the price limit of $999 set by Apple. AutoCAD 2014 for Mac was available for purchase from Autodesk's web site for $4,195 and AutoCAD LT 2014 for Mac for $1,200, or from an Autodesk authorized reseller. The latest version available for Mac is AutoCAD 2022 as of January 2022.

Version history

See also
 Autodesk 3ds Max
 Autodesk Maya
 Autodesk Revit
 AutoShade
 AutoSketch
 Comparison of computer-aided design software
 Design Web Format
Open source CAD software:
 LibreCAD
 FreeCAD
 BRL-CAD

References

Further reading

External links

 

Autodesk products
 
1982 software
IRIX software
Computer-aided design software
IOS software
Classic Mac OS software
Android (operating system) software
MacOS computer-aided design software
Software that uses Qt